Til Shiloh is the fourth album by Jamaican dancehall artist Buju Banton, released in 1995 by Loose Cannon Records, a short-lived subsidiary of Island Records. In 2019 the album was certified gold by the Recording Industry Association of America (RIAA).

The album marked a significant change in Banton's artistrty, going to a direction closer to roots reggae. Til Shiloh was widely acclaimed by critics, and is considered to be a classic album for reggae music.

Music and lyrics 

Til Shiloh was described as an introspective record. Its themes mainly explore Buju's then newfound faith in the Rastafari movement, with songs such as "Til I'm Laid to Rest", and "Untold Stories". This could be seen as a transition from the rude-bwoy style, made of glorifications of gun violence, to a more roots-oriented fashion. Jo-Ann Greene of AllMusic said that the album "consolidated his move into social awareness and adopted a more mature, reflective tone that signaled Banton's arrival as an artist able to make major creative statements".

The title track, which opened the album, was based on an introduction Banton had used in live shows. According to producer Donovan Germain, Til Shiloh mean forever."

Critical reception

Angus Taylor of BBC Music commented that " this is a very listenable landmark, which reminds us that while lyrical topics may differ, musically, reggae is one". AllMusic's reviewer Jo-Ann Greene said that "this is a gentler album than its predecessor, although still very much in a dancehall style. Another masterpiece". Robert Christgau stated that the record is "The most fully accomplished reggae album since the prime of Black Uhuru", praising "how he perfectly articulates empathy, vulnerability, and concern".

The album was listed in the 1999 book The Rough Guide: Reggae: 100 Essential CDs.

Reissues 
In 2002 the album an expanded and remastered edition was released on Island/IDJMG/Universal Records, featuring the tracks "Sensemilia Persecution" and "Rampage."

In 2020, the album was reissued on its 25th anniversary on December 18, including remixes of "Not An Easy Road", "Wanna Be Loved" and a unreleased track called "Come Inna The Dance" as bonus tracks.

Commercial performance
On the issue dated August 5, 1995, Til Shiloh debuted at number 148 on the US Billboard 200 chart. The album also debuted at number 27 on the US Top R&B/Hip-Hop Albums chart. The album was eventually certified gold by the Recording Industry Association of America (RIAA) for sales of over 500,000 copies in the United States.

Track listing

Personnel

Wayne Wonder	 – 	Vocals
Buju Banton	 – 	Vocals
Garnett Silk	 – 	Performer
2 Friends Crew	 – 	Vocals (background)
Carlton Batts	 – 	Mastering
Dalton Browne	 – 	Guitar
Glen Browne	 – 	Guitar (Acoustic)
Junior Chin	 – 	Trumpet
Clevie	 – 	drums, Producer
Lisa Cortes	 – 	Executive Producer, Editing
Bobby Digital	 – 	Producer, Engineer
Sly Dunbar	 – 	drums
Dean Fraser	 – 	Saxophone
Donovan Germain	 – 	Producer, Executive Producer
Sylvester Gordon	 – 	Producer, Engineer, Mixing Engineer
Marcia Griffiths	 – 	Vocals (background)

Leroy Mafia	 – 	Keyboards
Gary Jackson	 – 	Assistant Engineer
Robert Lyn	 – 	Keyboards
Steely	 – 	Bass, Keyboards, Producer, Mixing Engineer
Gary Sutherland	 – 	Engineer
Andrew Thomas	 – 	Engineer, Assistant Engineer
Handel Tucker	 – 	drums, Keyboards
Andre "Dreddy Ranks" Tyrell	 – 	drums, Producer, Engineer
Lloyd "Gitsy" Willis	 – 	Keyboards
Junior "Left Toe" Don	 – 	Bass
Mikey Williamson	 – 	Engineer
Prince Charles Alexander  – Remix
Tony Kelly	 – 	Mixing Engineer
Drew Lavyne	 – 	Editing
Geoffroy de Boismenu	 – 	Photography
Clive Allen	 – 	Cover Photo
Dave Fluxy	 – 	drums

Charts

Weekly charts

Certifications

References

Buju Banton albums
1995 albums
Island Records albums
Albums produced by Donovan Germain
Albums produced by Bobby Digital (Jamaican producer)
Albums produced by Dave Kelly (producer)
Albums produced by Steely & Clevie